Bobby Ertanto (born 2 August 1960) is a retired badminton player from Indonesia who specialized in doubles.

Career
Paired with a variety of fellow countrymen, he shared the Malaysia Open title in 1983, the Thailand Open title in 1985, the Badminton World Cup title in 1986, and the Asian Championships in 1987. He won mixed doubles at the 1986 Malaysia Open with Verawaty Wiharjo. Ertanto earned a bronze medal with Christian Hadinata at the 1983 IBF World Championships in Copenhagen. As a member of Indonesia's 1986 Thomas Cup team, Ertanto and partner Liem Swie King dropped the decisive final match in a narrow loss to Malaysia.

In 2013, he finished as a runner-up at the World Senior Championships in the men's doubles 50 in Turkey, and in 2017, he won double titles in the men's doubles 50 and mixed doubles 55 in Kochi, India.

Achievements

World Championships 
Men's Doubles

World Cup 
Men's doubles

World Masters Games 
Men's doubles

World Senior Championships 

Men's doubles

Mixed doubles

Asian Games 
Men's doubles

Southeast Asian Games 
Men's doubles

International Tournaments 
The World Badminton Grand Prix has been sanctioned by the International Badminton Federation from 1983 to 2006.

Men's doubles

Mixed doubles

References

External links 
http://bola.kompas.com/printnews/xml/2010/04/08/17524162/christian.hadinata.dikeroyok.tiga.pemain
https://web.archive.org/web/20110718034020/http://www2.sbg.ac.at/populorum/badminton/badminton_weltmeisterschaften_siegerliste.htm

Living people
1960 births
Sportspeople from Surabaya
Indonesian male badminton players
Asian Games medalists in badminton
Badminton players at the 1986 Asian Games
Asian Games bronze medalists for Indonesia
Medalists at the 1986 Asian Games
Southeast Asian Games gold medalists for Indonesia
Southeast Asian Games silver medalists for Indonesia
Southeast Asian Games bronze medalists for Indonesia
Southeast Asian Games medalists in badminton
Competitors at the 1983 Southeast Asian Games
Competitors at the 1987 Southeast Asian Games
21st-century Indonesian people
20th-century Indonesian people